WOW Hits 1 is the first and sole single-disc WOW Hits album, released on April 8, 2008. It contains sixteen songs that were popular on Christian radio at the time, and three bonus tracks. The album reached No. 4 on [[Billboard magazine|Billboard'''s]] Top Christian Albums chart in 2008, and No. 99 on the Billboard 200 that same year.

WOW announced two other single-disc albums, WOW Hits 2 and WOW Hits 3, to be released at a later time. The company planned to release WOW Hits more frequently and at a more affordable price. Both of these sequels were cancelled, however, and replaced with WOW Hits 2009'' on October 7, 2008.

Track listing

References

External links
 WOW Hits official website
 WOW Hits online

2008 compilation albums
01